Raymond Smith Dugan (May 30, 1878 – August 31, 1940) was an American astronomer and discoverer of minor planets. His parents were Jeremiah Welby and Mary Evelyn Smith and he was born in Montague in the U.S. state of Massachusetts.

His undergraduate and Masters was from Amherst College in Massachusetts in 1899 and 1902. Dugan then received his Ph.D. dissertation in 1905 at the Landessternwarte Heidelberg-Königstuhl (Königstuhl Observatory, near Heidelberg) at the University of Heidelberg.

At the time, the observatory at Heidelberg was a center of asteroid discovery under Max Wolf. During Dugan's stay there, he discovered 16 asteroids between 1902 and 1904, notably including 511 Davida.

He was employed by Princeton University as an instructor (1905–1908), assistant professor (1908–1920), and professor (1920—). He married Annette Rumford in 1909.

Dugan co-wrote an influential two-volume textbook in 1927 with Henry Norris Russell and John Quincy Stewart called Astronomy: A Revision of Young’s Manual of Astronomy (Ginn & Co., Boston, 1926–27, 1938, 1945). This became the standard astronomy textbook for about two decades. There are two volumes: the first is The Solar System and the second is Astrophysics and Stellar Astronomy.

The lunar crater Dugan and the main-belt asteroid 2772 Dugan are named in his honour.

See also 
 Dugan

References

External links
 Amherst College Class of 1899
 List of Dissertations at the Landessternwarte Heidelberg-Königstuhl

1878 births
1940 deaths
American astronomers
Amherst College alumni
Discoverers of asteroids

People from Montague, Massachusetts